The women's 200 metres at the 2014 IPC Athletics European Championships was held at the Swansea University Stadium from 18–23 August.

Medalists

Results

T11
Semifinals

Final

T12
Semifinals

Final

T35
Final

T36
Final

T44
Final

See also
List of IPC world records in athletics

References

200 metres
2014 in women's athletics
200 metres at the World Para Athletics European Championships